Ardakan (also Romanized as Ārdakān) is a village in Miyan Taleqan Rural District, in the Central District of Taleqan County, Alborz Province, Iran. At the 2006 census, its population was 251, in 66 families.

References 

Populated places in Taleqan County